In Colorado, State Highway 285 may refer to:
U.S. Route 285 in Colorado, the only Colorado highway numbered 285 since 1968
Colorado State Highway 285 (1938-1953) west of Denver